Qeshlaq (also Romanized as Qeshlāq) is a village in Ersi Rural District, in the Central District of Jolfa County, East Azerbaijan Province, Iran. At the 2006 census, its population was 674, in 187 families.

References 

Populated places in Jolfa County